Georges Creek is a  long 3rd order tributary to Whitethorn Creek in Pittsylvania County, Virginia.  Georges Creek is the source of water for the Town of Gretna, Virginia.

Course 
Georges Creek rises in a pond about 1 mile southwest of Gretna, Virginia and then flows southeast to join Whitethorn Creek about 0.75 miles southwest of Markham.

Watershed 
Georges Creek drains  of area, receives about 45.5 in/year of precipitation, has a wetness index of 413.02, and is about 48% forested.

See also 
 List of Virginia Rivers

External Links 
 Historical USGS water gauge on Georges Creek
 Water Quality Data

References 

Rivers of Virginia
Rivers of Pittsylvania County, Virginia
Tributaries of the Roanoke River